Horth is a surname. Notable people with the surname include:

Fabien Horth (born 1985), French swimmer
Matt Horth (born 1989), American soccer player

See also
Horthy (surname)